Central Synagogue (Congregation Ahawath Chesed Shaar Hashomayim) is a notable Reform synagogue located at 652 Lexington Avenue, at the corner of East 55th Street in Midtown Manhattan, New York City. It was built in 1870–1872 and was designed by Henry Fernbach in the Moorish Revival style as a copy of Budapest's Dohány Street Synagogue. It has been in continuous use by a congregation longer than any other in the state of New York, except Congregation Berith Sholom in Troy, New York, and is among the oldest existing synagogue buildings in the United States.

The building was designated a New York City landmark by the New York City Landmarks Preservation Commission in 1966, and was added to the National Register of Historic Places in 1970. It was then designated a National Historic Landmark in 1975.

History
The Ahawath Chesed congregation was founded in 1846 on Ludlow Street in Manhattan by German-speaking Jews from Bohemia. It merged in 1898 with Congregation Shaar Hashomayim, which was founded by German Jews in 1839 on Albany Street. The combined congregation bought the lot at Lexington Avenue and East 55th Street and engaged Henry Fernbach, the country's first prominent Jewish architect, to design it.

The dramatic style of the building was the subject of much debate during the construction. Some felt its excess would inspire envy and stand in the way of assimilation. Construction was completed in 1872.

After a fire in 1886, the building was restored by Ely Jacques Kahn.

The building was restored in the original style after an accidental fire in August 1998, which occurred just as a major renovation was nearing completion. The fire destroyed the roof and its supports. During the fire, the firefighters' sensitivity for the building saved all but the central pane in the rose window that dominates the eastern (Lexington Avenue) wall. Marble plaques on the north wall of the foyer honor the firefighters of the 8th Battalion of the New York City Fire Department. The restoration of the building was supervised by Hugh Hardy of Hardy Holzman Pfeiffer. Hardy restored some details to the interior that Ely Jacques Kahn had removed during the earlier restoration in 1886. The recent restoration was completed on September 9, 2001.

In March 2019, the mosque of the nearby Islamic Society of Mid-Manhattan was damaged by a fire in an adjoining restaurant. A rabbi of the synagogue invited the congregation of the mosque to hold services in the synagogue until its structure could be repaired.

Architecture
Although the brownstone exterior is "the finest extant example of the Moorish Revival style in New York City", the plan of the interior is Gothic in nature. The exterior is dominated by two octagonal towers topped by globular domes, as well as by the rose window of geometric design. A small row of arches just below the cornice, at the roof line, adds to the richness of the facade. The north facade, on East 55th Street, features six stained-glass windows framed by Moorish arches. The interior is "stenciled with rich blues, earthy reds, ocher, and gilt – Moorish, but distinctly 19th century American."

Services
Sensitive to the evolving interests and needs of the Reform Judaism community, Central Synagogue explores both traditional and alternative modes of prayer. In addition to daily morning minyan, Shabbat, holiday services, and celebrations of lifecycle events, the synagogue offers "Tot Shabbat" for children, and healing and community services. They have introduced Mishkan services on Saturday morning, which offer intimate, participatory Shabbat morning services.

Notable clergy

 Richard Botton, senior cantor (1974–1998)
 Angela Warnick Buchdahl (born 1972), senior cantor from 2011 to 2014, senior rabbi since 2014
 Daniel Mutlu, senior cantor (since 2017)
 Deborah Prinz, assistant rabbi (1978–1981)
 Peter Rubinstein, senior rabbi (1991–2014)
 Sheldon Zimmerman (born 1942), senior rabbi (1972–1985)

Notable members

Source:

Gallery

References

Notes

Bibliography

External links 

 
 Central Synagogue Restoration Booklet

1872 establishments in New York (state)
Burned religious buildings and structures in the United States
Czech-Jewish culture in the United States
German-Jewish culture in New York City
Lexington Avenue
Midtown Manhattan
Moorish Revival architecture in New York City
Moorish Revival synagogues
National Historic Landmarks in Manhattan
Properties of religious function on the National Register of Historic Places in Manhattan
Reform synagogues in New York City
Synagogue buildings with domes
Synagogues completed in 1872
Synagogues in Manhattan
Synagogues on the National Register of Historic Places in New York City